Pierre Hugues Victoire Merle (26 August 1766 – 5 December 1830) was a French general during the First French Empire of Napoleon. He joined the French army as a private in 1781 but after the French Revolution, the pace of promotion quickened. He was appointed a general officer in 1794 for distinguishing himself during the War of the Pyrenees. After leading a brigade at Austerlitz in December 1805, he was promoted again. His division was in the first wave of the 1808 invasion of Spain, which precipitated the Peninsular War. In Spain, he led his division at Medina de Rioseco, Corunna, First and Second Porto, Bussaco, Sabugal, and Fuentes de Oñoro. After being sent home from Spain, Merle was assigned to lead a division in the French invasion of Russia. He led his troops at First and Second Polotsk. He embraced the Bourbon cause in 1814, retired from the army in 1816, and died at Marseilles in 1830. Merle is one of the names inscribed under the Arc de Triomphe on Column 35.

References

 

1766 births
1830 deaths
People from Montreuil, Pas-de-Calais
Barons of the First French Empire
Generals of the First French Empire
French military personnel of the French Revolutionary Wars
French commanders of the Napoleonic Wars
Names inscribed under the Arc de Triomphe